In mathematics, a normed vector space or normed space is a vector space over the real or complex numbers, on which a norm is defined. A norm is the formalization and the generalization to real vector spaces of the intuitive notion of "length" in the real (physical) world. A norm is a real-valued function defined on the vector space that is commonly denoted  and has the following properties:

It is nonnegative, meaning that  for every vector 
It is positive on nonzero vectors, that is, 
 For every vector  and every scalar  
 The triangle inequality holds; that is, for every vectors  and  

A norm induces a distance, called its , by the formula

which makes any normed vector space into a metric space and a topological vector space. If this metric space is complete then the normed space is a Banach space. Every normed vector space can be "uniquely extended" to a Banach space, which makes normed spaces intimately related to Banach spaces. Every Banach space is a normed space but converse is not true. For example, the set of the finite sequences of real numbers can be normed with the Euclidean norm, but it is not complete for this norm. 

An inner product space is a normed vector space whose norm is the square root of the inner product of a vector and itself. The Euclidean norm of a Euclidean vector space is a special case that allows defining Euclidean distance by the formula

The study of normed spaces and Banach spaces is a fundamental part of functional analysis, which is a major subfield of mathematics.

Definition

A normed vector space is a vector space equipped with a norm. A  is a vector space equipped with a seminorm.

A useful variation of the triangle inequality is
 
for any vectors  and 

This also shows that a vector norm is a (uniformly) continuous function.

Property 3 depends on a choice of norm  on the field of scalars. For example, for a vector space over  one could take  to be the -adic absolute value.

Topological structure

The vector addition  is jointly continuous with respect to this topology. This follows directly from the triangle inequality.
This follows from the triangle inequality and homogeneity of the norm.

To put it more abstractly every seminormed vector space is a topological vector space and thus carries a topological structure which is induced by the semi-norm.

Two norms on the same vector space are called  if they define the same topology. On a finite-dimensional vector space, all norms are equivalent but this is not true for infinite dimensional vector spaces. 

All norms on a finite-dimensional vector space are equivalent from a topological viewpoint as they induce the same topology (although the resulting metric spaces need not be the same). And since any Euclidean space is complete, we can thus conclude that all finite-dimensional normed vector spaces are Banach spaces. A normed vector space  is locally compact if and only if the unit ball  is compact, which is the case if and only if  is finite-dimensional; this is a consequence of Riesz's lemma.  (In fact, a more general result is true: a topological vector space is locally compact if and only if it is finite-dimensional. The point here is that we don't assume the topology comes from a norm.)

The topology of a seminormed vector space has many nice properties. Given a neighbourhood system  around 0 we can construct all other neighbourhood systems as

with

Moreover, there exists a neighbourhood basis for the origin consisting of absorbing and convex sets. As this property is very useful in functional analysis, generalizations of normed vector spaces with this property are studied under the name locally convex spaces. 

Normable spaces 

A topological vector space  is called normable if there exists a norm  on  such that the canonical metric  induces the topology  on 
The following theorem is due to Kolmogorov:

Kolmogorov's normability criterion: A Hausdorff topological vector space is normable if and only if there exists a convex, von Neumann bounded neighborhood of 

A product of a family of normable spaces is normable if and only if only finitely many of the spaces are non-trivial (that is).

If  is a Hausdorff locally convex topological vector space then the following are equivalent:

  is normable.
  has a bounded neighborhood of the origin.

Furthermore,  is finite dimensional if and only if  is normable (here  denotes  endowed with the weak-* topology).

The topology  of the Fréchet space  as defined in the article on spaces of test functions and distributions, is defined by a countable family of norms but it is  a normable space because there does not exist any norm  on  such that the topology that this norm induces is equal to  

Even if a metrizable topological vector space has a topology that is defined by a family of norms, then it may nevertheless still fail to be normable space (meaning that its topology can not be defined by any  norm). 
An example of such a space is the Fréchet space  whose definition can be found in the article on spaces of test functions and distributions, because its topology  is defined by a countable family of norms but it is  a normable space because there does not exist any norm  on  such that the topology this norm induces is equal to   

Linear maps and dual spaces

The most important maps between two normed vector spaces are the continuous linear maps. Together with these maps, normed vector spaces form a category.

The norm is a continuous function on its vector space.  All linear maps between finite dimensional vector spaces are also continuous.

An isometry between two normed vector spaces is a linear map  which preserves the norm (meaning  for all vectors ). Isometries are always continuous and injective. Isometrically isomorphic normed vector spaces are identical for all practical purposes.

When speaking of normed vector spaces, we augment the notion of dual space to take the norm into account. The norm of a functional  is defined as the supremum of  where  ranges over all unit vectors (that is, vectors of norm ) in  This turns  into a normed vector space. An important theorem about continuous linear functionals on normed vector spaces is the Hahn–Banach theorem.

Normed spaces as quotient spaces of seminormed spaces

The definition of many normed spaces (in particular, Banach spaces) involves a seminorm defined on a vector space and then the normed space is defined as the quotient space by the subspace of elements of seminorm zero.  For instance, with the  spaces, the function defined by

is a seminorm on the vector space of all functions on which the Lebesgue integral on the right hand side is defined and finite.  However, the seminorm is equal to zero for any function supported on a set of Lebesgue measure zero.  These functions form a subspace which we "quotient out", making them equivalent to the zero function.

Finite product spaces

Given  seminormed spaces  with seminorms  denote the product space by

where vector addition defined as

and scalar multiplication defined as

Define a new function  by

which is a seminorm on  The function  is a norm if and only if all  are norms.

More generally, for each real  the map  defined by 

is a semi norm. 
For each  this defines the same topological space.

A straightforward argument involving elementary linear algebra shows that the only finite-dimensional seminormed spaces are those arising as the product space of a normed space and a space with trivial seminorm.  Consequently, many of the more interesting examples and applications of seminormed spaces occur for infinite-dimensional vector spaces.

See also 

 Banach space, normed vector spaces which are complete with respect to the metric induced by the norm
 
 Finsler manifold, where the length of each tangent vector is determined by a norm
 Inner product space, normed vector spaces where the norm is given by an inner product
 
 Locally convex topological vector space – a vector space with a topology defined by convex open sets
 Space (mathematics) – mathematical set with some added structure

References

Bibliography

External links